The Aminoshikimate pathway is a biochemical pathway present in some plants, which has been studied by biologists, biochemists and especially those interested in manufacture of novel antibiotic drugs.  The pathway is a novel variation of the shikimate pathway. The aminoshikimate pathway was first discovered and studied in the rifamycin B producer Amycolatopsis mediterranei. Its end product, 3-amino-5-hydroxybenzoate, serves as an initiator for polyketide synthases in the biosynthesis of ansamycins.

Overview
Floss and coworkers identified the gene cluster associated with the aminoshikimate pathway in Amycolatopsis mediterranei. The enzyme-catalyzed condensation of 1-deoxy-1-imino-D-erythrose 4-phosphate with phosphoenolpyruvate to form 4-amino-3,4-dideoxy-d-arabino-heptulosonic acid 7-phosphate has been proposed to be the first committed step in the aminoshikimate pathway. Guo and Frost demonstrated that the unusual metabolite, 1-deoxy-1-imino-D-erythrose 4-phosphate, is derived from 3-amino-3-deoxy-D-fructose 6-phosphate. In addition, kanosamine biosynthesis has been directly implicated by Guo and Frost as the source of the aminoshikimate pathway's nitrogen atom.

Uses
Aminoshikimate pathway has been assembled in E. coli to synthesize aminoshikimic acid, which is a promising starting material for the synthesis of antiinfluenza agent oseltamivir (brand name Tamiflu).

References

Metabolic pathways